The 2009 IBSF World Snooker Championship for women took place from 15 to 25 November 2009 at the Hyderabad International Convention Center Hall, Hyderabad. Ng On-yee won the tournament by defeating Kathy Parashis 5–2 in the final.

The tournament was organised by the International Billiards and Snooker Federation. Defending champion Reanne Evans did not participate as she could not raise the funds to travel from England to India for the event. Participants were divided between four round-robin groups (three of six players each, and one with five players), with the top four from each group qualifying for the knockout stage. Vidya Pillai and Ramona Belmont both won all of their five group matches, and Yu Ching Ching won all four of hers. Ng and Parashis were both fourth-placed in their respective groups, and both recovered from 2–3 behind to defeat opponents in the semi-finals. Ng won the first  of the final, but missed the final  in the second frame, which Parashis then  to level the match. Ng took the next four frames, to secure the title. She made the highest break of the match, 36, in the last frame. When the score was 3–1, the organisers decided to conduct drug tests, which delayed the match for about 30 minutes. According to the report on Cue Sports India, Ng, who became the youngest International Billiards and Snooker Federation women's snooker champion, demonstrated "exceptional potting along with copy book safety"

Some players experienced stomach upsets. During the group stage, Santhinee Jaisuekul was taken to hospital after her match against Jaique Ip, and Nahla Sunni did not appear for her match against Chitra Magimairaj. There were only four s of over 50 points, Ng scored the highest break of the tournament, 77, and also recorded a 57. Bi Zhu Qing had breaks of 65 and 52. She won the third place play-off 3–2 against Ramona Belmont.

Knockout Rounds 

Results for the knockout stage are shown below.

References

2009 in snooker
Snooker amateur tournaments
International sports competitions hosted by India
2009 in Indian sport